Hibbertia psilocarpa is a species of flowering plant in the family Dilleniaceae and is endemic to the south-west of Western Australia. It is a shrub with spirally arranged, narrow oblong to linear leaves and yellow flowers usually with four to eight stamens, all on one side two glabrous carpels.

Description
There are usually four to eight stamens fused at the base and arranged on one side of two glabrous carpels that each contain four to six ovules. Flowering mostly occurs from July to October.

Taxonomy
Hibbertia psilocarpa was first formally described in 2004 by Judith R. Wheeler in the journal Nuytsia from specimens she collected on the Ravensthorpe to Hopetoun Road in 1986. The specific epithet (psilocarpa) means "smooth-fruited".

Distribution and habitat
This hibbertia grows in a variety of habitats including heath and mallee from near Hyden, to the Fitzgerald River National Park, Ongerup and Israelite Bay.

Conservation status
Hibbertia psilocarpa is classified as "not threatened" by the Western Australian Government Department of Biodiversity, Conservation and Attractions.

See also
List of Hibbertia species

References

psilocarpa
Flora of Western Australia
Plants described in 2004